Bradley N. Barquist (born 1968) is an American former long-distance runner who represented the United States at the men's 10,000 meters at the 1996 Summer Olympics. He finished 30th overall as a non-qualifier, with a time of 29:11.20. He is also currently a coach for the Interlake High School cross country and track teams. Notably, he is a key member of Discount Ski Team, who as of March 12, 2018, became the back-to-back champions of CityLeague Friday night racing at Alpental.

References

1968 births
American male long-distance runners
Athletes (track and field) at the 1996 Summer Olympics
Living people
Olympic track and field athletes of the United States
People from Issaquah, Washington
Sportspeople from Bellevue, Washington
20th-century American people